The Roman villa of Centcelles is located in the municipality of Constantí, in Catalonia (Spain). It contains a masterpiece of Early Christian Art. In one of its rooms, which has been almost completely preserved, you can see the oldest known dome mosaic with a Christian theme in the Roman world, dated to the 4th century AD.

See also 
 Centum Cellas

References 

Roman villas in Spain
Roman sites in Catalonia
Province of Tarragona